Show Me the Movie! was a weekly Australian television comedy panel show, which premiered on Network 10 on 22 March 2018 and ran until 28 March 2019. The program was hosted by Rove McManus who, with team captains Joel Creasey, Jane Harber (2018) and Brooke Satchwell (2019), and a panel of actors, comedians and international guests, contested a series of rounds. The title was a play on the iconic movie line, "show me the money", spoken by Tom Cruise in Jerry Maguire.

Cast
 Rove McManus - Host
 Joel Creasey - Team Captain
 Jane Harber - Team Captain (2018)
 Brooke Satchwell - Team Captain (2019)

Production
In May 2018, the series was renewed for a second season. Rove McManus returned as host, as did team captain Joel Creasey, with newcomer Brooke Satchwell as the other captain. Season 2 premiered on 8 February 2019.

Episodes

Season 1 (2018)

Season 2 (2019)

References

Network 10 original programming
Australian comedy television series
2010s Australian game shows
2018 Australian television series debuts
2019 Australian television series endings